Wettinia is a palm genus, consisting of flowering plants in the family Arecaceae. The genus, established in 1837, contains some 20 species, but more seem to await discovery considering that 4 species - W. aequatorialis, W. lanata, W. minima and W. panamensis - were described as late as 1995. The genus is broadly divided into two groups. One group has the fruits tightly packed, while the other, formerly classified as genus Catoblastus, has fruits scattered along the inflorescence branches. It is not known whether these groups are both monophyletic. The genus is named after Frederick Augustus II of Saxony, of the House of Wettin.

Morphology
Palms of the genus Wettinia are monoecious, medium-sized to large, and typically solitary-trunked. They have a low, dense cone of brown or black stilt roots, and pinnate leaves. The rope-like inflorescences of the plant emerge from leathery spathes, and grow in a circular pattern around one or more trunk rings beneath the crown shaft. They are unisexual, fleshy, and cream colored or white. The fruit is small to medium-sized and elongated, green to bluish black in color. It grows either dispersed along the branches or in a tightly packed ellipsoid or sausage-like cylinder.

Distribution
Members of this genus are found in Panama and in northern and northwestern South America (Venezuela, Colombia, Ecuador, Peru, Bolivia, northwestern Brazil). Although none of the species are frost-tolerant, they are found primarily in cooler and higher-altitude locations, up to 2,200 m in the case of Wettinia kalbreyeri, and are particularly prevalent along the foothills of the Andes.

Species
Wettinia s. str. group:
 Wettinia aequatorialis R.Bernal - Ecuador
 Wettinia augusta Poepp. & Endl. - Colombia, Peru, Bolivia, northwestern Brazil
 Wettinia castanea H.E.Moore & J.Dransf. - Colombia
 Wettinia fascicularis  (Burret) H.E.Moore & J.Dransf. - Colombia, Ecuador
 Wettinia hirsuta Burret - Colombia
 Wettinia lanata R.Bernal - Colombia
 Wettinia longipetala A.H.Gentry - Pasco region of Peru
 Wettinia minima R.Bernal - Ecuador
 Wettinia oxycarpa Galeano-Garcés & R.Bernal - Colombia, Ecuador
 Wettinia panamensis R.Bernal - Panama
 Wettinia quinaria (O.F.Cook & Doyle) Burret - Colombia, Ecuador
 Wettinia verruculosa H.E.Moore - Colombia, Ecuador

Catoblastus group:
 Wettinia aequalis (O.F.Cook & Doyle) R.Bernal  - Colombia, Ecuador, Panama
 Wettinia anomala  (Burret) R.Bernal - Colombia, Ecuador
 Wettinia disticha  (R.Bernal) R.Bernal - Colombia
 Wettinia drudei  (O.F.Cook & Doyle) A.J.Hend. - Colombia, Peru, Ecuador, northwestern Brazil
 Wettinia kalbreyeri  (Burret) R.Bernal - Colombia, Ecuador
 Wettinia maynensis Spruce - Peru, Colombia, Ecuador
 Wettinia microcarpa (Burret) R.Bernal - Norte de Santander region of Colombia
 Wettinia praemorsa (Willd.) Wess.Boer - Colombia, Venezuela
 Wettinia radiata (O.F.Cook & Doyle) R.Bernal - Colombia, Panama

Footnotes

References
  (2003): An Encyclopedia of Cultivated Palms. Timber Press. HTML preview at Google Books
  (2008): Wettinia. In: World Checklist of Arecaceae. Retrieved 2008-APR-01.
  (1995): Field Guide to the Palms of the Americas. Princeton University Press, Princeton, New Jersey.  HTML preview at Google Books

 
Arecaceae genera
Neotropical realm flora
Taxa named by Eduard Friedrich Poeppig
Taxonomy articles created by Polbot